Wang Jianwei (born October 1954) is a lieutenant general (zhongjiang) in the Chinese People's Liberation Army. He was promoted to the rank of major general in July 2004 and lieutenant general in July 2011. He was Political Commissioner of National University of Defense Technology between July 2010 and July 2017.

Biography
Wang was born in Xinhuang Dong Autonomous County, Hunan, China in October 1954, while his ancestral home in Laizhou, Shandong. He enlisted in the People's Liberation Army (PLA) in November1969. He participated in the Sino-Vietnamese War. After war, he served in the Guangzhou Military Region for a long time. In October 2002, he was promoted to become Director of Political Department of the 75th Group Army. He became a professor at National University of Defense Technology in August 2005. He was President of PLA Nanjing Political College in March 2006, and held that office until August 2007, when he was appointed Head of Propaganda Division of the People's Liberation Army General Political Department. He became Political Commissar of National University of Defense Technology in July 2010, and served until July 2017.

He is a delegate to the 19th National Congress of the Communist Party of China.

References

1954 births
Living people
People from Xinhuang Dong Autonomous County
People's Liberation Army generals from Hunan